Mall Molesworth defeated Esna Boyd 6–3, 10–8 in the final to win the women's singles tennis title at the 1922 Australasian Championships.

Draw

Key
 Q = Qualifier
 WC = Wild card
 LL = Lucky loser
 r = Retired

External links
 1922 Australasian Championships on ITFtennis.com, the source for this draw

1922 in Australian tennis
Women's Singles
1922 in Australian women's sport